The 1998 All-Ireland Senior Hurling Championship Final was the 111th All-Ireland Final and the culmination of the 1998 All-Ireland Senior Hurling Championship, an inter-county hurling tournament for the top teams in Ireland. The match was held at Croke Park, Dublin, on 13 September 1998, between Offaly and Kilkenny. It was the first all-Leinster All-Ireland final with victory going to Offaly on a score line of 2-16 to 1-13.  It was the first time that a defeated team from the earlier rounds of the championship had come through to win the All-Ireland final.

All-Ireland Senior Hurling Championship Final
All-Ireland Senior Hurling Championship Final, 1998
All-Ireland Senior Hurling Championship Final
All-Ireland Senior Hurling Championship Finals
Kilkenny GAA matches
Offaly GAA matches